Dexter Maurice Wynn (born February 25, 1981) is a former American football cornerback. He was drafted by the Philadelphia Eagles in the sixth round of the 2004 NFL Draft. He played college football at Colorado State.

Wynn has also been a member of the Houston Texans and Detroit Lions.

Early years
Dexter played high school football at Rampart High School in Colorado Springs, as a wide receiver and cornerback. He led the Rams to the 1998 State Championship (14-0), earning Colorado Springs Metro League Player of the Year honors, and USA Today's Colorado Player of the Year. In the State Championship game he accounted for all five of his team's scores, and intercepted a pass in the endzone to seal the victory, earning a spot in Sports Illustrated's "Faces in the Crowd".

College
From 2000-2003, Dexter was a standout performer at Colorado State University earning All-Conference honors at both cornerback and return specialist from 2001-2003.  Dexter holds the season record for Colorado State kickoff return average.

Professional career

Philadelphia Eagles
Draft in the 6th round.  Wynn spent all of 2004 and 2005 with the Philadelphia Eagles as a backup cornerback and kick returner.  In 2006, he was initially cut at the beginning of the season and re-signed after injuries to the Eagles defensive backfield.  He appeared in 28 games as an Eagle.

Houston Texans
In November 2006, Wynn was waived by Philadelphia and claimed by the Houston Texans following the Eagles' signing of William James.  He was released on August 29, 2008.

Detroit Lions
Wynn was signed by the Detroit Lions on December 9, 2008 after the team waived cornerback Brian Kelly. He was placed on injured reserve on August 31, and was not retained for the 2010 season.

External links
Houston Texans bio

1981 births
Living people
Sportspeople from Sumter, South Carolina
Players of American football from Colorado Springs, Colorado
American football cornerbacks
American football return specialists
Colorado State Rams football players
Philadelphia Eagles players
Houston Texans players
Detroit Lions players